The 14th European Badminton Championships were held in Den Bosch, Netherlands, between 10 and 17 April 1994, and hosted by the European Badminton Union and the Nederlandse Badminton Bond.

Medalists

Results

Semi-finals

Finals

Medal account

References
Results at BE
Resultat
Badminton: Gold for England: European finals
Svensk uppvisning i badminton-EM

European Badminton Championships
European Badminton Championships
B
Badminton tournaments in the Netherlands
International sports competitions hosted by the Netherlands
Sports competitions in 's-Hertogenbosch